Jimmy Montanero (born August 24, 1960) is a retired soccer defender from Ecuador, who earned seventeen caps for the Ecuador national team from 1989 to 1993. Nicknamed "El Mormón", he played all of his career for Barcelona Sporting Club from Guayaquil (1979–1999).

Montanero played for Barcelona (1979–1999) obtaining two Copa Libertadores de America runners-up (1990 & 1998) and various semi-finals. He was the captain of the team for almost two decades being respected and considered a player with much character.

Montanero is a member of the Church of Jesus Christ of Latter-day Saints and was widely known as "El Mormon" during his football career.

References
 

1960 births
Living people
Ecuadorian footballers
Ecuadorian Latter Day Saints
Barcelona S.C. footballers
Association football defenders
Ecuador international footballers
1989 Copa América players
1991 Copa América players
1993 Copa América players
Place of birth missing (living people)